Botanical gardens in Taiwan have collections consisting entirely of Taiwan native and endemic species; most have a collection that include plants from around the world. There are botanical gardens and arboreta in all states and territories of Taiwan, most are administered by local governments, some are privately owned.
 Chiayi Botanical Garden, Chiayi
 Taipei Botanical Garden, Taipei
 Taichung Botanical Garden, Taichung

References 

 
Taiwan
Botanical gardens